The Sussex County Interscholastic League (SCIL) was a high school athletic conference located in Sussex County and Morris County, New Jersey.  The league was formed in 1976 when a number of new high schools opened up in the previous year.  The formation of the league was to promote athletics and to cut down on travel time and costs.  The league operated under the auspices of the New Jersey State Interscholastic Athletic Association (NJSIAA), the statewide organization for high school sports.

In 2009, all SCIL member schools merged with other Morris County member schools to form the Northwest Jersey Athletic Conference, as a result of the realignment of conferences by the NJSIAA.

Former participating schools

NOTE:  Sussex Tech was an Associate Member

League sports
The SCIL offered a total of 21 sports (12 boys; 9 girls).  In the sport of swimming, Wallkill Valley and Sussex Tech competed as one team known as Wall-Tech. Additionally, Sussex Tech participated in the SCIL in bowling.

Fall sports 
Cheerleading 
Cross Country (Boys)
Cross Country (Girls)
Field Hockey
Football
Soccer (B)
Soccer (G)
Volleyball (G)
Marching Band

Winter sports 
Basketball (B)
Basketball (G)
Bowling
Skiing (B)
Skiing (G)
Swimming (B)
Swimming (G)
Wrestling
Ice Hockey (B)
Indoor Track (B&G)

Spring sports 
Baseball
Golf
Softball
Volleyball (B)
Track & Field (B)
Track & Field (G)
Lacrosse (G)
Lacrosse (B)
Tennis(B)

External links
Sussex County Interscholastic League
Standings presented by High Point Regional High School
NJSIAA

New Jersey high school athletic conferences
Sports organizations established in 1976
Sussex County, New Jersey
Morris County, New Jersey